Do You Speak American? is a documentary film and accompanying book about journalist Robert MacNeil's investigation into how different people throughout the United States of America speak. The book and documentary look at the evolution of America's way of speaking from the English language to various ways of speaking in regions throughout the country. Divisions of ethnicity, geography and social status and how they affect how Americans communicate are addressed. As part of the project, MacNeil traveled across the country conducting interviews with ordinary people as well as experts such as William Labov.

In the United States, the documentary was broadcast in several parts on PBS. The companion book was co-authored by MacNeil and William Cran.

References

External links
Official site on PBS

PBS original programming
American documentary television films
Works about American English
Documentary films about words and language
Documentary films about the United States
2005 films
Nan A. Talese books
2000s American films